From the Earth to the Moon is a 12-part 1998 HBO television miniseries co-produced by Ron Howard, Brian Grazer, Tom Hanks, and Michael Bostick telling the story of the Apollo program during the 1960s and early 1970s in docudrama format. Largely based on Andrew Chaikin's 1994 book, A Man on the Moon, the series is known for its accurate telling of the story of Apollo and the special effects under visual director Ernest D. Farino.

The series takes its title from, but is not based upon, the 1865 Jules Verne science fiction novel From the Earth to the Moon. Hanks appears in every episode, introducing each of the first eleven. The last episode is represented in a pseudo-documentary format narrated by Blythe Danner, interspersed with a reenactment of the making of Georges Méliès' 1902 film Le Voyage dans la Lune, which was in part inspired by Verne's novel. Hanks narrates and appears in these scenes as Méliès' assistant.

Cast

The miniseries has a fairly large cast, driven in part by the fact that it portrays 30 of the 32 astronauts who flew, or were preparing to fly, the twelve missions of the Apollo program. (The only two Apollo astronauts not portrayed by credited actors are Apollo 13 Command Module pilot Jack Swigert, who is heard but not seen in Episode 8, and Apollo 17 Command Module pilot Ronald Evans, who has a brief appearance in the liftoff scene of Apollo 17 in the final episode.) Members of many of the astronauts' families, and other NASA and non-NASA personnel, are also portrayed.

Several fictional (or fictionalized) characters are also included, notably television newscaster Emmett Seaborn (Lane Smith) who appears in nine of the twelve episodes.

Astronaut David Scott, from Apollo 15, was the chief technological consultant.

Episodes
The twelve episodes, each directed by different individuals, use a variety of viewpoints and themes, while sequentially covering the Mercury, Gemini and Apollo programs. Lane Smith portrays Emmett Seaborn, a seasoned reporter for a fictional television network, who covers the U.S. space program from its earliest days, providing continuity for most of the episodes.

Integration with existing films
The miniseries, concentrating on the Apollo space program, was produced with an intent not to repeat other dramatic portrayals of events of the space race.

Project Mercury, which was portrayed in the 1983 film The Right Stuff, was briefly summarized in the first episode.  Miniseries producers Hanks, Howard and Grazer, who had previously produced the 1995 film Apollo 13, shot the episode "We Interrupt This Program" from the perspective of the media covering that flight, as the film had already covered the story from the point of view of the crew and the mission control team.

Production
Many of the actors had opportunity to interact and form friendships with the real life astronauts they were portraying. Brett Cullen, who played Apollo 9 Command Module pilot and Apollo 15 commander David Scott, was invited to the Scott family home each time an episode he appeared in was first televised. Two short clips from the final scenes of Apollo 13 were used in "That's All There Is"; a splashdown sequence, and a view of the recovery ship USS Iwo Jima (portrayed by USS New Orleans).

The original series was shot in Super 35, intended to be viewed on standard television sets of the time in 1.33:1 aspect ratio. With the proliferation of widescreen flat-panel TV sets the series was remastered in the 1.78:1 aspect ratio and re-released in 2005 as a 5-disc DVD box set. As is the case with most material shot in this format, the widescreen framing causes the loss (in some shots) of the top and bottom parts of the frames from the original broadcast, but reveals additional information on the left and right. This is not always noticeable because of careful transfer process, but in some scenes important details are lost. For example, in the first episode, when the Gemini 8 / Agena assembly is tumbling around in space with a stuck thruster, the thruster is not visible in the new widescreen version, as it is cut off by the top of the frame. Some captions have also been compromised.

Parts of the miniseries were filmed at the Disney-MGM Studios (now Disney's Hollywood Studios) in Orlando, Florida.  Scenes of the moonwalks were shot inside the blimp hangars on a former Marine base in Tustin, California. Approximately half the area inside was converted to the Moon's surface, with the remainder used to hold production trailers. To simulate lunar surface gravity, weather balloons filled with helium were attached to the backs of the actors playing the astronauts in the lunar extravehicular activity scenes, effectively reducing their weights to one-sixth.

The score of "Spider" prominently features an imitation of the main title theme from the 1963 World War II movie The Great Escape, and Tom Kelly jokes about having a crew digging a tunnel out of the Grumman plant. The episode also featured a real Apollo Lunar Module (LM-13), which had been built for the Apollo 18 mission but was never used due to budget cuts.

Awards and nominations
The series was nominated for seventeen Emmy awards and won three: Outstanding Miniseries, Outstanding Casting for a Miniseries or a Movie and Outstanding Hairstyling for a Miniseries, Movie or a Special. In addition, the series won a 1999 Golden Globe Award for Best Mini-Series or Motion Picture Made for TV.

See also
 Apollo 11 in popular culture

References

External links
 

1998 American television series debuts
1998 American television series endings
1998 in American television
1990s American television miniseries
American biographical series
Best Miniseries or Television Movie Golden Globe winners
HBO original programming
Primetime Emmy Award for Outstanding Miniseries winners
Primetime Emmy Award-winning television series
Science docudramas
Television shows based on books
Television series about the Apollo program
Television series based on actual events
Television series by Imagine Entertainment
Television series by Home Box Office
Television series by Playtone
Cultural depictions of Georges Méliès
Films scored by Mason Daring
Cultural depictions of Buzz Aldrin
Cultural depictions of Neil Armstrong
Cultural depictions of Michael Collins (astronaut)
Gus Grissom
Wally Schirra
Alan Shepard
Deke Slayton
Frank Borman
Pete Conrad
Jim Lovell
James McDivitt
Thomas P. Stafford
Ed White (astronaut)
John Young (astronaut)
William Anders
Alan Bean
Gene Cernan
Charles Duke
Ronald Evans (astronaut)
Richard F. Gordon Jr.
James Irwin
Ken Mattingly
Edgar Mitchell
Stuart Roosa
David Scott
Alfred Worden
Harrison Schmitt
Television series about astronauts